Amiret Township is a township in Lyon County, Minnesota, United States. The population was 230 at the 2000 census.

History
Amiret Township was originally called Madison Township, and under the latter name was organized in 1874. The present name, adopted in 1879, is for Amiretta Sykes, the wife of a railroad official.

Geography

Demographics
As of the census of 2000, there were 230 people, 85 households, and 71 families residing in the township. The population density was 6.3 people per square mile (2.4/km2). There were 95 housing units at an average density of 2.6/sq mi (1.0/km2). The racial makeup of the township was 100.00% White.

There were 85 households, out of which 30.6% had children under the age of 18 living with them, 83.5% were married couples living together, and 15.3% were non-families. 11.8% of all households were made up of individuals, and 5.9% had someone living alone who was 65 years of age or older. The average household size was 2.71 and the average family size was 2.96.

In the township the population was spread out, with 25.2% under the age of 18, 7.0% from 18 to 24, 23.9% from 25 to 44, 30.4% from 45 to 64, and 13.5% who were 65 years of age or older. The median age was 43 years. For every 100 females, there were 96.6 males.  For every 100 females age 18 and over, there were 104.8 males.

The median income for a household in the township was $49,375, and the median income for a family was $55,250. Males had a median income of $29,583 versus $21,875 for females. The per capita income for the township was $16,683. About 9.5% of families and 13.2% of the population were below the poverty line, including 19.4% of those under the age of eighteen and none of those 65 or over.

References

Townships in Lyon County, Minnesota
Townships in Minnesota